Gautam Gupta is an Indian television actor and model. He was last seen in the Balaji Telefilms show Kuch Toh Hai Tere Mere Darmiyaan, which aired 
on Star Plus.

Filmography 
 Film
 2007 - Go as Abhay Narula

 Television
 2014-2015 - Meri Aashiqui Tumse Hi as Sharman Mitesh Parekh
 2015-2016 - Kuch Toh Hai Tere Mere Darmiyaan as Madhavan "Maddy" Venkat 
2016 - "Box Cricket League" as himself

Personal life 
Gupta is from a family of people in the film industry, that work in the business world of entertainment. His father Sushil Gupta owns a post-production company. Gautam was always interested in arts, but it was not until a friend recommended him to try an acting class, when he realized that acting was what he wanted to do. He married his Meri Aashiqui co-star Smriti Khanna on 23 November 2017.Their daughter  was born on 15 April 2020.

References

External links

Male actors from Mumbai
Living people
1988 births